Negwagon (YTB-834) was a United States Navy  named for Odawa Chief Negwagon. Negwagon was the second US Navy ship to bear the name.

Construction

The contract for Negwagon was awarded 5 June 1973. She was laid down on 24 July 1974 at Marinette, Wisconsin, by Marinette Marine and launched 27 March 1975.

Operational history

First put into service in 1975, Negwagon served at Naval Submarine Base New London Connecticut.  Sometime after 1998, Negwagon was transferred to Naval Support Activity, La Maddalena, Italy.  Stricken from the Navy List 20 July 2007, ex-Negwagon was transferred to the Hellenic Navy 10 January 2008.

References

External links
 

 

Natick-class large harbor tugs
Ships built by Marinette Marine
1975 ships